The Primetime Emmy Award for Sound Mixing for a Nonfiction or Reality Program (Single or Multi-Camera) is awarded to one television documentary or nonfiction series each year. Beginning in 2019, nominations are divided between documentary/nonfiction programs and reality programs, proportional to the number of submissions of each.

In the following list, the first titles listed in gold are the winners; those not in gold are nominees, which are listed in alphabetical order. The years given are those in which the ceremonies took place:

Winners and nominations

1980s

1990s

2000s

2010s

2020s

Programs with multiple awards

4 awards
 American Masters

2 awards
 Deadliest Catch

Individuals with multiple awards

3 awards
 Tom Fleischman

Programs with multiple nominations

11 nominations
 The Amazing Race
10 nominations
 Deadliest Catch

7 nominations
 Anthony Bourdain: Parts Unknown
6 nominations
 American Masters
 Survivor

2 nominations
 RuPaul's Drag Race
 Stanley Tucci: Searching for Italy

Notes

References

External links
 Academy of Television Arts and Sciences website

Sound Mixing for a Nonfiction Program (Single or Multi-Camera)